Kazimierz Edward Gołojuch (born 5 February 1964 in Łańcut) is a Polish politician. He was elected to the Sejm on 25 September 2005, getting 8245 votes in 23 Rzeszów district as a candidate from the Law and Justice list.

See also
Members of Polish Sejm 2005-2007

External links
Kazimierz Gołojuch - parliamentary page - includes declarations of interest, voting record, and transcripts of speeches.
Kazimierz Gołojuch - office page - includes activities, biography, foto gallery.

1964 births
Living people
People from Łańcut
Law and Justice politicians
Members of the Polish Sejm 2005–2007
Members of the Polish Sejm 2007–2011
Members of the Polish Sejm 2011–2015
Members of the Polish Sejm 2015–2019
Members of the Polish Sejm 2019–2023
Recipients of the Bronze Cross of Merit (Poland)